The 2003 NBDL Draft was the third annual draft by the National Basketball Development League. It was held on November 6, 2003.

Draft

Key

Round 1

Round 2

Round 3

Round 4

Round 5

Round 6

Round 7

Round 8

Round 9

Round 10

References

Draft
NBA G League draft
National Basketball Association lists
National Basketball Development League draft